Nemophora barbatellus is a moth of the Adelidae family. It is found in southern Europe.

References

External links
lepiforum.de
Species info at nkis.info

Moths described in 1847
Adelidae
Moths of Europe
Moths of Asia